The Durham County Cricket League was a league operating in County Durham in the North East of England.  The league was originally formed in 1937 but only lasted two seasons before it disbanded.  The league reformed in 1948 with the first champions being Peases West Welfare CC, who were based in Crook. 17 different clubs won the league over its 64 seasons. Crook Town CC were the most successful club with 12 league titles to their credit followed by Esh Winning CC with 7 wins, Kimblesworth CC with 6 and Dean and Chapter CW CC, Ushaw Moor CC and Evenwood CC with 5 titles each.

The league disbanded at the end of the 2012 season and merged with the Durham Senior League and Durham Coast League to form the Durham Cricket League after each of the three leagues lost clubs to the enlarged North East Premier League.

List of League Champions
1948 - Peases West Welfare
1949 - Dean and Chapter CW
1950 - Seaham Park
1951 - Crook Town
1952 - Langley Park CW
1953 - Murton CW
1954 - Murton CW
1955 - Seaham Park
1956 - Murton CW
1957 - Hetton Lyons
1958 - Dean and Chapter CW
1959 - Dean and Chapter CW
1960 - Dean and Chapter CW
1961 - Dean and Chapter CW
1962 - Shildon BR
1963 - Crook Town
1964 - Crook Town
1965 - Ushaw Moor
1966 - Shildon BR
1967 - Ushaw Moor
1968 - Ushaw Moor
1969 - Ushaw Moor
1970 - Ushaw Moor
1971 - Shildon BR
1972 - Etherley
1973 - Ushaw Moor
1974 - Crook Town
1975 - Willington
1976 - Langley Park
1977 - Evenwood
1978 - Langley Park
1979 - Evenwood
1980 - Crook Town
1981 - Crook Town
1982 - Crook Town
1983 - Crook Town
1984 - Leadgate
1985 - Esh Winning
1986 - Crook Town
1987 - Crook Town
1988 - Tudhoe
1989 - Esh Winning
1990 - Esh Winning
1991 - Crook Town
1992 - Crook Town
1993 - Sedgefield
1994 - Kimblesworth
1995 - Tudhoe
1996 - Tudhoe
1997 - Hetton Lyons
1998 - Tudhoe
1999 - Leadgate
2000 - Leadgate
2001 - Kimblesworth
2002 - Evenwood
2003 - Evenwood
2004 - Evenwood
2005 - Esh Winning
2006 - Kimblesworth
2007 - Esh Winning
2008 - Kimblesworth
2009 - Kimblesworth
2010 - Kimblesworth
2011 - Esh Winning
2012 - Esh Winning

English domestic cricket competitions
Sport in County Durham